Gyulai Várvédők RK is a Hungarian rugby club in Gyula. They currently play in Hungarian National Championship II.

History
The club was founded in 2010.

Hungarian rugby union teams
Rugby clubs established in 2010